The Délémontez-Cauchy DC.1 is a French ultralight monoplane designed by Jean Délémontez for amateur construction, derived from the Jodel D.9.

Specifications

References

External links
 

1980s French civil utility aircraft
Homebuilt aircraft
Single-engined tractor aircraft
Low-wing aircraft
Aircraft first flown in 1980